YLT may refer to:

 Yo La Tengo, rock band
 Alert Airport, Canada (IATA code YLT)
 Young's Literal Translation of the Bible
  Your Local Time Zone, used by Internet servers that know your current location